So Good is the thirteenth studio album by American R&B/Soul vocal group The Whispers, Released on July 26, 1984 via SOLAR Records. This album reached number eight on the Billboard Soul Albums chart.

Track listing
"Some Kinda Lover" - (Bo Watson, Kenneth Edmonds)  5:53   
"Contagious" - (Bo Watson, Bobby Lovelace, Melvin Gentry, Reggie Calloway)  5:00   
"Sweet Sensation" - (Barry Sarna, Pamela Phillips Oland, Wardell Potts)  4:46   
"On Impact" - (Kevin Walker, Pamela Phillips Oland, Wilmer Raglin)  5:25   
"Suddenly" - (Grady Wilkins, Percy Scott)  5:48   
"Don't Keep Me Waiting" - (Kenneth Edmonds)  4:36   
"Are You Going My Way" - (Nicholas Caldwell)  5:08   
"Never Too Late" - (Bill Simmons, Bo Watson, Bobby Lovelace, Kenneth Gant, Nicholas Caldwell, Reggie Calloway)  3:40   
"So Good" - (Leon Sylvers III, Pamela Phillips Oland, Rickey Smith)  3:18

Charts

Weekly charts

Year-end charts

Singles

References

External links
 The Whispers-Love So Good at Discogs

1984 albums
The Whispers albums
SOLAR Records albums
Albums produced by Leon Sylvers III